Castro de A Cidá is a ruined site in Province of A Coruña, Galicia, Spain.

References

Buildings and structures in the Province of A Coruña
Archaeological sites in Galicia (Spain)